Mauricio Alejandro Donoso Pérez (born 30 April 1976) is a Chilean former footballer.

He played as an attacking midfielder during his years active.

Club career
He has performed at Cobreloa, Universidad de Chile, Colo-Colo, Everton, Antofagasta in Chile, and Pumas of UNAM in Mexico.

International career
Donoso took part of the Chile U20 squad at the 1995 FIFA World Youth Championship and played a match. At senior level, he was involved in the Chile national team in 1999, and has represented his country twice.

Personal life
His older brother, José Luis, was a Chile under-20 international footballer and took part of the squad at the 1988 South American U-20 Championship.

He holds Ecuadorian citizenship after having played in Ecuador.

Honours

Clubs
Deportivo Quito
 Serie A (2): 2008, 2009

References

External links

1976 births
Living people
Chilean footballers
Naturalized citizens of Ecuador
Chilean expatriate footballers
Chile international footballers
Chile under-20 international footballers
Cobreloa footballers
Club Universidad Nacional footballers
Universidad de Chile footballers
Colo-Colo footballers
Everton de Viña del Mar footballers
C.D. Antofagasta footballers
S.D. Quito footballers
Deportes Iquique footballers
Coquimbo Unido footballers
Chilean Primera División players
Liga MX players
Ecuadorian Serie A players
Primera B de Chile players
Footballers from Santiago
Chilean expatriate sportspeople in Ecuador
Chilean expatriate sportspeople in Mexico
Expatriate footballers in Ecuador
Expatriate footballers in Mexico
Association football midfielders